Paul Rubell is an  American film editor. His career spans 25 years in both film and television.

Rubell obtained his bachelor's degree in English literature from the University of California, Los Angeles. Rubell worked for a time with editor Lou Lombardo. His first editing credit was for the film The Final Terror (1983). He worked for about ten years on films and programming for television before returning to feature films as the editor for The Island of Dr. Moreau.

Rubell has been elected to membership in the American Cinema Editors.

Awards
 1989 nominated for an Emmy for My Name is Bill W.
 1990 nominated for an Eddie Award for Best Edited Television Special for My Name is Bill W.
 1996 nominated for an Eddie Award for Best Edited Motion Picture for Non-Commercial Television for The Burning Season
 1996 nominated for an Emmy for Andersonville
 1997 won the Eddie Award for Best Edited Episode from a Television Mini-Series for Andersonville (episode 2)
 2000 nominated for a Satellite Award for Best Editing  for The Insider
 2000 nominated for an Eddie Award for Best Edited Feature Film - Dramatic for The Insider
 2000 nominated for an Academy Award for Best Film Editing for The Insider
 2005 won the Satellite Award for Best Editing for Collateral
 2005 nominated for BAFTA Award for Best Editing for Collateral
 2005 nominated for an Eddie Award for Best Edited Feature Film - Dramatic for Collateral
 2005 nominated for an Academy Award for Film Editing for Collateral

Filmography

References

External links

1952 births
American film editors
American Cinema Editors
University of California, Los Angeles alumni
Living people
People from Los Angeles